Anindilyakwa may refer to:

 Anindilyakwa people, an ethnic group of Australia
 Anindilyakwa language, an Australian language
 Anindilyakwa Indigenous Protected Area, a protected area in the Northern Territory of Australia
 Anindilyakwa Land Council